Kapp Wien is a headland at the southeastern side of the island of Jan Mayen, about halfway between Olonkinbyen and Sørkapp. It defines the northeastern extension of the bay Hornbækbukta.

References

Headlands of Jan Mayen